Gene Forrell (1915–2005) was an American composer and conductor.

Forrell was born Eugene Finkelhor  in Pittsburgh, Pennsylvania, United States, where he attended Allderdice High School and Duquesne University. He left Duquesne for New York City and a scholarship from the Dalcroze School.

As a composer and orchestral conductor he worked in theater, dance, and television. 
He wrote the soundtrack to N.Y., N.Y. — A Day in New York, 1957, filmed by Francis Thompson. According to IMDB.com, "The soundtrack is light, breezy, and staccato." 
His other soundtrack credits include To Be Alive, a 1964 Academy Award-winning documentary. He served as a musical director in Europe and America. In England, he conducted the Alexandra Choral Society, the Enfield Grand Opera, the English Sinfonia, and the English National Orchestra. He also wrote commercial jingles. For several years, he conducted and recorded the popular Firestone Christmas albums. Forrell was also a longtime board member of the Musicians Foundation. Forrell did the musical score to the original version of The Private Life of a Cat ©1946 Alexander Hammid with "words" by Maya Deren.

Forrell died on September 21, 2005, at his home in New York.

References 
 Monica L. Haynes (2005). Obituary: Gene Forrell: Award-winning composer and conductor. Retrieved September 28, 2005.
 J. Hailey (2013). N.Y., N.Y.: Storyline. Retrieved August 2, 2013.

1915 births
2005 deaths
Musicians from Pittsburgh
American male conductors (music)
Duquesne University alumni
Taylor Allderdice High School alumni
Classical musicians from Pennsylvania
20th-century American conductors (music)
20th-century American male musicians